St. Patrick's Primary School may refer to:

St. Patrick's Primary School, Aghagallon, Aghagallon, County Armagh, Northern Ireland
St. Patrick's Primar School, Annaghmore, County Tyrone, Northern Ireland
St. Patrick's Primary School, Ardboe, Ardboe, County Tyrone, Northern Ireland
St. Patrick's Primary School, Armagh, Armagh, Northern Ireland
St. Patrick's Primary School, Augher, Augher, County Tyrone, Northern Ireland
St. Patrick's Primary School, Craigavon, Craigavon, County Armagh, Northern Ireland
St. Patrick's Primary School, Crossmaglen, Crossmaglen, County Armagh, Northern Ireland
St. Patrick's Primary School, Cullyhanna, Cullyhanna, County Armagh, Northern Ireland
St. Patrick's Primary School, Donaghmore, Donaghmore, County Tyrone, Northern Ireland
St. Patrick's Primary School, Dungannon, Dungannon, County Tyrone, Northern Ireland
St. Patrick's Primary School, Hilltown, Hilltown, County Down, Northern Ireland
St. Patrick's Primary School, Holywood, Holywood, County Down, Northern Ireland
St. Patrick's Primary School, Liverpool, England
St. Patrick's Primary School, Loup, Loup, County Londonderry, Northern Ireland
St. Patrick's Primary School, Magheralin, Magheralin, County Down, Northern Ireland
St. Patrick's Primary School, Mayobridge, Mayobridge, County Down, Northern Ireland
St. Patrick's Primary School, Mentone, Mentone, Victoria, Australia
St. Patrick's Primary School, Moneymore, Moneymore, County Londonderry, Northern Ireland
St. Patrick's Primary School, Newry, Newry, County Down, Northern Ireland
St. Patrick's Primary School, Rathfriland, Rathfriland, County Down, Northern Ireland
St. Patrick's Primary School, Strathaven, Strathaven, Lanarkshire, Scotland